The 2012–13 season will be the 109th year of Beşiktaş J.K. and their 55th consecutive year in the Süper Lig.

Squad

Out on loan

Transfers

In 

Total spending:  €3,000,000

Out

Competitions

Legend

Pre-season friendlies

Süper Lig

Table

Turkish Cup

Squad statistics

Appearances and goals

|-
|colspan="14"|Players away from the club on loan:
|-
|colspan="14"|Players who appeared for Beşiktaş no longer at the club:

Top scorers

Disciplinary record

References

External links
 Beşiktaş J.K.

Beşiktaş J.K. seasons
Besiktas Jk